The Francovich House, at 557 Washington St. in Reno, Nevada, USA, was built during 1899–1900. It was listed on the National Register of Historic Places in 1983 and was delisted later the same year, when it was moved to save it from demolition.

References 

National Register of Historic Places in Reno, Nevada
Queen Anne architecture in Nevada
Colonial Revival architecture in Nevada
Houses completed in 1889
Houses in Reno, Nevada
Houses on the National Register of Historic Places in Nevada